Smith is an occupational surname originating in England. It is the most prevalent surname in the United Kingdom, the United States, Australia, Canada, and New Zealand, and the fifth most common surname in the Republic of Ireland. In the United States, the surname Smith is particularly prevalent among those of English, Scottish, and Irish descent, but is also a common surname among African-Americans, which can be attributed either to African slaves having been given the surname of their masters, or to being an occupational name, as some southern African-Americans took this surname to reflect their or their father's trade. 2,442,977 Americans shared the surname Smith at the time of the 2010 census, and more than 500,000 people shared it in the United Kingdom as of 2006. At the turn of the 20th century, the surname was sufficiently prevalent in England to have prompted the statement: "Common to every village in England, north, south, east, and west"; and sufficiently common on the (European) continent (in various forms) to be "common in most countries of Europe".

Etymology and history
The name refers to a smith, originally deriving from smið or smiþ, the Old English term meaning one who works in metal related to the word smitan, the Old English form of smite, which also meant strike (as in early 17th century Biblical English: the verb "to smite" = to hit). The Old English word smiþ comes from the Proto-Germanic word smiþaz. Smithy comes from the Old English word smiðē from the Proto-Germanic smiðjon. The use of Smith as an occupational surname dates back to Anglo-Saxon times, when inherited surnames were still unknown: Ecceard Smith of County Durham, North East England, was recorded in 975.

Although the name is derived from a common occupation, many later Smiths had no connection to that occupation, but adopted or were given the surname precisely because of its commonness. For example:
 It is common for people in English-speaking countries to adopt the surname Smith in order to maintain a secret identity, when they wish to avoid being found; see also John Smith.
 During the colonization of North America, some Native Americans took the name for use in dealing with colonists.
 During the period of slavery in the United States, many other slaves were known by the surname of their masters, or adopted those surnames upon their emancipation.
 During the world wars, many German Americans anglicised the common and equivalent German surname Schmidt or Schmitz to Smith to avoid discrimination.

A popular misconception holds that at the beginning of the 20th century, when many new immigrants were entering the U.S., civil servants at Ellis Island responsible for cataloging the entry of such persons sometimes arbitrarily assigned new surnames if the immigrants' original surname was particularly lengthy, or difficult for the processor to spell or pronounce. While such claims may be exaggerated, many immigrants did choose to begin their American lives with more "American" names, particularly with Anglicised versions of their birth names; the German Schmidt was often Anglicized to Smith not only during the world wars, but also commonly in times of peace, and the equivalent Polish Kowalski was Anglicized to Smith as well.

Geographical distribution
As of 2014, 64.3% of all known bearers of the surname Smith were residents of the United States (frequency 1:121), 13.7% of England (1:88), 4.2% of Canada (1:191), 4.0% of Australia (1:130), 3.9% of South Africa (1:295), 1.4% of Scotland (1:84) and 1.0% of Jamaica (1:62).

In Scotland, the frequency of the surname was higher than average (1:84) in the following council areas:

 1. Shetland (1:33)
 2. Outer Hebrides (1:46)
 3. Moray (1:49)
 4. Angus (1:50)
 5. Aberdeenshire (1:57)
 6. Dundee (1:70)
 7. Aberdeen (1:71)
 8. East Lothian (1:75)
 9. Perth and Kinross (1:76)
 10. Midlothian (1:77)
 11. Dumfries and Galloway (1:77)
 12. Fife (1:82)
 13. South Lanarkshire (1:83)

In England, the frequency of the surname was higher than average (1:88) in the following counties:

 1. Lincolnshire (1:61)
 2. Worcestershire (1:64)
 3. Warwickshire (1:67)
 4. Nottinghamshire (1:67)
 5. Derbyshire (1:67)
 6. Norfolk (1:68)
 7. Suffolk (1:69)
 8. Rutland (1:69)
 9. East Riding of Yorkshire (1:69)
 10. Essex (1:70)
 11. Leicestershire (1:70)
 12. Staffordshire (1:71)
 13. Northamptonshire (1:72)
 14. Herefordshire (1:74)
 15. Gloucestershire (1:75)
 16. North Yorkshire (1:77)
 17. Isle of Wight (1:78)
 18. Kent (1:78)
 19. South Yorkshire (1:78)
 20. Cambridgeshire (1:80)
 21. Northumberland (1:81)
 22. Hampshire (1:82)
 23. Durham (1:82)
 24. West Midlands (1:83)
 25. Tyne and Wear (1:83)
 26. West Yorkshire (1:83)
 27. Oxfordshire (1:85)
 28. Merseyside (1:85)
 29. Lancashire (1:87)
 30. Wiltshire (1:88)

In the United States, the frequency of the surname was higher than average (1:121) in the following states:

 1. Mississippi (1:61)
 2. Alabama (1:69)
 3. Arkansas (1:74)
 4. Tennessee (1:80)
 5. South Carolina (1:80)
 6. North Carolina (1:83)
 7. Kentucky (1:83)
 8. Oklahoma (1:84)
 9. West Virginia (1:87)
 10. Georgia (1:88)
 11. Louisiana (1:91)
 12. Indiana (1:97)
 13. Ohio (1:102)
 14. Maryland (1:104)
 15. Virginia (1:105)
 16. Kansas (1:106)
 17. Missouri (1:106)
 18. Idaho (1:106)
 19. Utah (1:108)
 20. Michigan (1:111)
 21. Delaware (1:113)
 22. Maine (1:114)
 23. Wyoming (1:118)
 24. Oregon (1:118)

Variations
Variations of the surname Smith also remain very common. These include different spellings of the English name, and versions in other languages.

English variations
There is some disagreement about the origins of the numerous variations of the name Smith. The addition of an e at the end of the name is sometimes considered an affectation, but may have arisen either as an attempt to spell smithy or as the Middle English adjectival form of smith, which would have been used in surnames based on location rather than occupation (in other words, for someone living near or at the smithy).

Likewise, the replacement of the i with a y in Smyth or Smythe is also often considered an affectation but may have originally occurred because of the difficulty of reading blackletter text, where Smith might look like Snuth or Simth. However, Charles Bardsley wrote in 1901, "The y in Smyth is the almost invariable spelling in early rolls, so that it cannot exactly be styled a modern affectation."

Some variants (such as Smijth) were adopted by individuals for personal reasons, while others may have arisen independently or as offshoots from the Smith root. Names such as Smither and Smithers may in some cases be variants of Smith but in others independent surnames based on a meaning of light and active attributed to smyther. Additional derivatives include Smithman, Smithson and Smithfield (see below). Athersmith may derive from at the Smith.

Other variations focus on specialisms within the profession; for example Blacksmith, from those who worked predominantly with iron, Whitesmith, from those who worked with tin (and the more obvious Tinsmith), Brownsmith and Redsmith, from those who worked with copper (Coppersmith and Greensmith; copper is green when oxidised), Silversmith and Goldsmith – and those based on the goods produced, such as Hammersmith, Bladesmith, Naismith (nail-smith), Arrowsmith which in turn was shortened to Arsmith, or Shoesmith (referring to horseshoes). Sixsmith is a variant spelling of a sickle- or scythe-smith. Wildsmith in turn is a corruption of wheelsmith

The patronymic practice of attaching son to the end of a name to indicate that the bearer is the child of the original holder has also led to the surnames Smithson and Smisson. Historically, "Smitty" has been a common nickname given to someone with the surname, Smith; in some instances, this usage has passed into "Smitty" being used as a surname itself.

Other languages
Surnames relating to smiths and blacksmiths are found across the world. When relevant, transliterations are included in parentheses and italicised, and adaptations (i.e. anglicisations or gallicisations) in brackets. Additionally, brief etymologies are noted if a name used in a certain language derives from another language.

Germanic

Romance

Celtic

Slavic

Other European

South Asian

Other

See also
 List of people with surname Smith
 List of most common surnames in Europe
 Smith Family (disambiguation)
 Smith (given name)
 Smith (taxonomic authority)
 Smith and Jones (disambiguation)
 Psmith

Notes

References

Citations

Bibliography

 
   The section heading referenced here reads "Smith, Smyth, Smythe", suggesting these to be the most common variants at the time (1901).
 
 
 
 
 
 
 
 
 The URL here is to a reprint on the Irish Ancestors website.  Tables of contents for back issues of Irish Roots Magazine are found at https://web.archive.org/web/20091217104309/http://irishroots.ie/Back%20Issues%20List.htm and there are two listings for the title here, one in 'Issue No. 26 (1998 Second quarter)', the other in 'Issue No. 48 (2003 Fourth quarter)'.  It is not clear whether the latter is a simple reprint of the former or an update.  The reprinted article notes 'From Irish Roots, (No. 28)'.
 
 
 
 US Census Bureau (9 May 1995). s:1990 Census Name Files dist.all.last (1-100). Retrieved 25 February 2008.

External links

 Origin and history of the name of Smith, with biographies of all the most noted persons of that name, Chicago, Ill., American Publishers' Association, 1902. via Internet Archive

Surnames
English-language surnames
Surnames of German origin
Occupational surnames
Surnames of English origin
English-language occupational surnames